Keisuke Ito may refer to:

 Keisuke Ito (botanist), Japanese physician and biologist
 Keisuke Ito (swimmer), Japanese swimmer
 Keisuke Ito (composer), Japanese video game music composer